In chemistry, initiation is a chemical reaction that triggers one or more secondary reactions. Often the initiation reaction generates a reactive intermediate from a stable molecule which is then involved in secondary reactions. In polymerisation, initiation is followed by a chain reaction and termination.

References

See also
 Free radical addition

Reaction mechanisms